IXYS Corporation is an American company based in Milpitas, California. IXYS focuses on power semiconductors, radio-frequency (RF) power semiconductors, and digital and analog integrated circuits (ICs).

History 
Dr. Nathan Zommer founded IXYS Corporation in 1983 in Silicon Valley, Santa Clara, California.
IXYS was originally a fabless power semiconductor device company.
In 1989, IXYS provided power MOSFETs for the General Motors EV1.

IXYS provided high-power IGBTs for the KTX-II high-speed train.

In 2001, the company acquired the British semiconductor manufacturer Westcode.

In December 2009, IXYS Corporation announced that it will buy Zilog, which is now the company's wholly owned subsidiary.

In July 2013, IXYS Corporation finished acquiring Samsung Electronics' 4- and 8-bit microcontroller business, and the 4- and 8-bit microcontrollers acquired from Samsung will be offered by Zilog, Inc.

In August 2017, IXYS Corporation was acquired by Littelfuse Inc in exchange for $750 million in cash and stocks.

In January 2018, Littelfuse finished acquiring IXYS Corporation and IXYS was delisted from NASDAQ.

Products 

IXYS Corporation's production of power semiconductor consists of Power MOS (metal–oxide–silicon) transistors and power bipolar. These series of products convert high voltage or current electricity to regular power. The company's production of integrated circuits are used for analog, mixed-signal and digital interface solutions in communication, such as solid-state relays (SSRs), line card access switch (LCAS), Litelink™. The RF Power Semiconductors convert high rates electricity for amplification or reception. In addition, IXYS provides laser diode drivers, direct copper bond (DCB).

References

External links 
 IXYS Corporation
 IXYS RF Colorado
 IXYS Power
 IXYS UK Westcode Ltd.—formerly part of Westinghouse Brake and Signal Company Ltd.

Electronics companies established in 1983
1983 establishments in California
Companies based in Silicon Valley
Companies based in Milpitas, California
Semiconductor companies of the United States
Companies formerly listed on the Nasdaq
2017 mergers and acquisitions